The Scottish Albums Chart is a chart compiled by the Official Charts Company (OCC) which is based on how physical and digital sales towards the UK Albums Chart fare in Scotland. The official singles chart for Scotland, the Scottish Singles Chart, which was based on how physical and digital sales towards the UK Singles Chart were faring in Scotland, has not been published since 20 November 2020.

Since 20 November 2020, only the Scottish Albums Chart has been published by the OCC, and it has been based on physical sales only, with the OCC only publishing the albums chart on their website since 11 December 2020.

History
In the late 1970s and early 1980s, Radio & Record News and Record Business magazines compiled Scottish charts which were broadcast on Independent Local Radio stations such as Radio Clyde and Radio Forth; these showed particular favour for hard rock, punk and new wave while soul and other "black" styles would fare less well; for example, on 23 June 1978, Radio & Record News placed Heatwave at number 15 UK-wide but number 40 in Scotland, the O'Jays at number 21 UK-wide but not in the Scottish Top 40 and Bob Marley at number 26 UK-wide but not in the Scottish Top 40, but AC/DC at number 38 UK-wide and number 20 in Scotland, the Clash at number 62 UK-wide and number 22 in Scotland, and the Vibrators at number 65 UK-wide but number 39 in Scotland.

In the late 1980s, as frustration in Scotland at perceived isolation from the Thatcher government grew, pressure was applied for the creation of an official Scottish chart; Brian Guthri of the Scottish Record Industry Association claimed that the official UK charts did not pick up many sales by Scottish acts as they were not polling enough shops in Scotland, citing Win's "You've Got the Power" (the theme song from McEwan's Lager adverts) as an example and a month of research determined significant differences from the UK charts, with indie acts selling particularly well. That autumn, the SRIA voted to set up its own chart, suggesting that the balance of 75 chart return shops in Greater London to 45 in Scotland was unfair. Although a Scottish chart had been broadcast on BBC Radio Scotland beforehand, the first official Scottish Gallup charts were published on 17 March 1991; notably, they placed Scottish band the Silencers at number 6 in the album chart (only number 39 UK-wide) and the Simpsons' album higher than the Inspector Morse soundtrack, which was 11 places higher UK-wide. The launch of this chart was heralded by Neil Ross of the Scottish Record Industry Association, who again suggested that the UK charts were disproportionately slanted towards sales in London and the south of England, while music manager Bruce Findlay suggested that Scotland could potentially produce a music TV show with as much international appeal as the then-popular DEF II series Rapido. From 20 September 1991, a short weekly TV programme based around the Scottish chart was broadcast by BBC1 Scotland on Friday nights, hosted by Nicky Campbell, then of Radio 1 and the chart continued to be broadcast on Monday nights on BBC Radio Scotland although it was dropped, along with other night-time music programmes on that station, during the last year of Gallup's contract. Frankie Miller's song "Caledonia", also included in McEwan's adverts which were only shown in Scotland and Northern Ireland, topped the Scottish chart while only being a minor UK-wide hit. An unofficial Scottish Network Chart was also taken by Scottish commercial stations, including Radio Tay, in the early 1990s.

Archives on the Official Charts Company website go back to February 1994, when Millward Brown took over as chart compilers and the number of retailers sampled throughout the UK increased. After this relaunch, Scottish Television launched a show based around the official Scottish chart, called Chart Bite. Until 2000, the Scottish album chart included albums eligible only for the compilation album chart at a UK-wide level.

How the UK and Scottish charts were compiled diverged several times from 1994. Whereas digital downloads were incorporated into the UK singles chart from April 2005 and albums from April 2006, the Scottish charts remained physical sales only until the week ending 10 October 2009 when digital sales were included. This brought how the two charts were compiled in line for almost five years until the week ending 6 July 2014, when streaming was included in the UK singles chart and later in the UK album chart for the week ending 1 March 2015. The Scottish charts remained compiled of digital and physical sales only until the week ending 20 November 2020, when the singles chart was discontinued and only physical sales are counted for the album chart. The final number one single was Always by Scottish band the Snuts.

Number ones

1994

1995

1996

1997

1998

1999

2000

2001

2002

2003

2004

2005

2006

2007

2008

2009

2010

2011

2012

2013

2014

2015

2016

2017

2018

2019

2020

2021

2022

2023

Notes

References

External links
 Top 40 Scottish Singles on OCC website
 Top 40 Scottish Albums on OCC website

British record charts